The "angry young men" were a group of mostly working- and middle-class British playwrights and novelists who became prominent in the 1950s. The group's leading figures included John Osborne and Kingsley Amis; other popular figures included John Braine, Alan Sillitoe, and John Wain. The phrase was originally coined by the Royal Court Theatre's press officer in order to promote Osborne's 1956 play Look Back in Anger. It is thought to be derived from the autobiography of Leslie Paul, founder of the Woodcraft Folk, whose Angry Young Man was published in 1951.

Following the success of the Osborne play, the label "angry young men" was later applied by British media to describe young writers who were characterised by a disillusionment with traditional British society. The term, always imprecise, began to have less meaning over the years as the writers to whom it was originally applied became more divergent, and many of them dismissed the label as useless.

John Osborne
The playwright John Osborne was the archetypal example, and his signature play Look Back in Anger (1956) attracted attention to a style of drama contrasting strongly with the genteel and understated works of Terence Rattigan that had been in fashion. Osborne's The Entertainer (1957) secured his reputation, with Laurence Olivier playing the protagonist Archie Rice. Osborne became a successful entrepreneur, partnering with Tony Richardson to form the film production company Woodfall. In addition to being seen as archetypal, Osborne was claimed to be one of the leading literary figures of the Angry Young Men "movement". This "movement" was identified after the Second World War as some British intellectuals began to question orthodox mores. Osborne expressed his own concerns through his plays and could be relied upon to provide controversial “angry” pronouncements, delivered with an immaturity compared to impatient youth.

Some critics ridiculed Osborne for a lack of maturity in his statements, and fuelled a debate about his politics and those of the "movement". Osborne also had consistent and often sarcastic criticism of the British Left. In 1961, he made public headlines with "Letter to my Fellow Countrymen" that represented a "damn you, England" mentality. and protested against Britain's decision to join the arms race. Osborne strongly expressed anger at what Britain had become at that time, but also at what he felt it had failed to become.

Look Back in Anger
Osborne's play Look Back in Anger was the monumental literary work that influenced the concept of the Angry Young Man. He wrote the play to express what it felt like to live in England during the 1950s. The main issues that Angry Young Men had were "impatience with the status quo, refusal to be co-opted by a bankrupt society, an instinctive solidarity with the lower classes". Referred to as "kitchen sink realism", literary works began to deal with lower class themes. In the decades prior to Osborne and other authors, less attention had been given to literature that illuminated the treatment and living circumstances experienced by the lower classes. As the Angry Young Men movement began to articulate these themes, the acceptance of related issues was more widespread. Osborne depicted these issues within his play through the eyes of his protagonist, Jimmy. Throughout the play, Jimmy was seeing "the wrong people go hungry, the wrong people be loved, the wrong people dying".

In Britain, following the Second World War, the quality of life for lower-class citizens was still poor; Osborne used this theme to demonstrate how the state of Britain was guilty of neglect towards those that needed assistance the most. In the play there are comparisons of educated people with savages, illuminating the major difference between classes. Alison remarks on this issue while she, Jimmy and Cliff are sharing an apartment, stating how "she felt she had been placed into a jungle". Jimmy was represented as an embodiment of the young, rebellious post-war generation that questioned the state and its actions. Look Back in Anger provided some of its audience with the hope that Osborne's work would revitalise the British theatre and enable it to act as a "harbinger of the New Left".

Definition and divisions
As a catchphrase, the term was applied to a large, incoherently defined group, and was rejected by most of the writers to whom it was applied: see, for example, "Answer to a Letter from Joe" by John Wain (Essays on Literature and Ideas, 1963). Publisher Tom Maschler, who edited a collection of political-literary essays by the 'Angries' (Declaration, 1957), commented: "(T)hey do not belong to a united movement. Far from it; they attack one another directly or indirectly in these pages. Some were even reluctant to appear between the same covers with others whose views they violently oppose."

Their political views were usually seen as identifying with the left, sometimes anarchistic, and they described social alienation of different kinds. They also often expressed their critical views on society as a whole, criticising certain behaviours or groups in different ways. On television, their writings were often expressed in plays in anthology drama series such as Armchair Theatre (ITV, 1956–68) and The Wednesday Play (BBC, 1964–70); this leads to a confusion with the kitchen sink drama category of the early 1960s.

Throughout the late 1950s and into the 1960s, the "Angries" often met at or were nurtured by the Royal Shakespeare Company, and through this venue other such emerging playwrights as Edward Bond and Wole Soyinka were exposed to the AYM movement directly.

The New University Wits (a term applied by William Van O'Connor in his 1963 study The New University Wits and the End of Modernism) refers to Oxbridge malcontents who explored the contrast between their upper-class university privilege and their middle-class upbringings. These included Kingsley Amis, Philip Larkin and John Wain, all of whom were also part of the poetic circle known as "The Movement".

Also included among the Angry Young Men was a small group of young existentialist philosophers, led by Colin Wilson and also including Stuart Holroyd and Bill Hopkins.

Outside of these subgroupings, the 'Angries' included writers mostly of lower-class origin concerned with their political and economic aspirations. Apart from John Osborne, these included Harold Pinter, John Braine, Arnold Wesker and Alan Sillitoe. Some of these (e.g., Pinter) were left-wing and some (e.g., Braine) later became right-wing. William Cooper, the early-model Angry Young Man, though Cambridge-educated, was a "provincial" writer in his frankness and material and is included in this group.

Crosscurrents in the late 1950s
Friendships, rivalries, and acknowledgments of common literary aims within each of these groups could be intense (the relationship between Amis and Larkin is considered one of the great literary friendships of the 20th century). However, the writers in each group tended to view the other groups with bewilderment and incomprehension. Observers and critics could find no common thread between them all. They were contemporaries by age. They were not of the upper-class establishment, nor were they protégés of existing literary circles. It was essentially a male "movement". Shelagh Delaney, author of A Taste of Honey (1958), was described as an "angry young woman".

Associated writers
Kingsley Amis
John Arden
Stan Barstow
Edward Bond
John Braine
Michael Hastings
Thomas Hinde
Stuart Holroyd
Bill Hopkins
Bernard Kops
John Osborne
Harold Pinter
Alan Sillitoe
David Storey
Kenneth Tynan
John Wain
Keith Waterhouse
Arnold Wesker
Colin Wilson

Other media
In the song "Where Are They Now" from the 1973 album Preservation Act 1 by The Kinks, the following lines appear: "Where have all the angry young men gone?/ Barstow and Osborne, Waterhouse and Sillitoe/ Where on earth did they all go?"

See also

British New Wave, also known as the Angry Young Man film genre—a British film genre of the 1960s, featuring working-class heroes and left-wing themes.
Beat Generation

References 
 Success Stories (1988) by Harry Ritchie, a well-documented history of the AYM as a journalistic phenomenon
The Angry Young Men: A Literary Comedy of the 1950s (2002) by Humphrey Carpenter, an anecdotal group biography

British culture
British literary movements